The Waterlow score (or  Waterlow scale) gives an estimated risk for the development of a pressure sore in a given patient. The tool was developed in 1985 by clinical nurse teacher Judy Waterlow.

Scoring criteria
The following areas are assessed for each patient and assigned a point value.

Build/weight for height 
Skin type/visual risk areas
Sex and age
Malnutrition Screening Tool
Continence
Mobility
no

Additional points in special risk categories are assigned to selected patients.

Tissue malnutrition
Neurological deficit
Major surgery or trauma

Potential scores range from 1 to 64. A total Waterlow score ≥10 indicates risk for pressure ulcer. A high risk score is ≥15. A very high risk exists at scores ≥20. The reverse side of the Waterlow score lists examples of preventive aids and interventions.

Criticism
While packaged conveniently as a laminated card, the score has received criticism owing to its large number of scored items. This, combined with a lack of operational definitions, may reduce its reliability.

See also
Braden Scale for Predicting Pressure Ulcer Risk

References 

Nursing
Skin conditions resulting from physical factors
Medical scoring system